Abington School District is a medium-sized, suburban, public school district that serves the borough of Rockledge and Abington Township in Montgomery County, Pennsylvania. The district operates one high school, one middle school, and seven elementary schools. 

Abington School District encompasses approximately 16 square miles. According to the 2000 federal census data, it serves a resident population of 58,680. In 2009, the district residents' per capita income was $29,932 a year, while the median family income was $70,226. In the Commonwealth, the median family income was $49,501  and the United States median family income was $49,445, in 2010. In the 2021-2022 school year, Abington School District provided basic educational services to 8,292 pupils. It employed: 551 teachers, 399 full-time and part-time support personnel, and 62 administrators. Abington School District received more than $16.2 million in state funding in school year 2007-08.

Secondary schools
Abington Senior High (9th, 10th, 11th, 12th)
Abington Middle School (6th, 7th, 8th)

Elementary Schools (K-5)
Copper Beech
Highland
McKinley
Overlook
Roslyn
Rydal
Willow Hill

Abington School District vs. Schempp
The school district received some notoriety in the 1960s when it became one of the key parties in the school prayer controversy, with Abington School District v. Schempp. The Supreme Court case resulted in a declaration of the unconstitutionality of school-sanctioned Bible reading. This case is considered a landmark and surprised former President Dwight Eisenhower, who had appointed Earl Warren as Chief Justice.

References

School districts in Montgomery County, Pennsylvania